was a Japanese voice actor and narrator. He was born in Tokyo on February 15, 1939, and died on March 3, 2008, in Shibuya from cancer. His death was announced at the beginning of the 2nd Seiyu Awards.

Roles

Film
Lupin the Third: Pilot Film (1969) (Arsène Lupin III)
Otoko wa tsurai yo (1969) (Sakura's boyfriend)
Warau Michael (2006) (Narrator)

Television dramas
Phantom Agents (1964) (Tsukiaki)

Television animation
Moomin (1969) (Snorken)
Tomorrow's Joe (1970) (Carlos Rivera)
Andersen Monogatari (1971) (Ib)
Star of the Giants (1971) (Nishioka)
Tensai Bakabon (1971)
Space Battleship Yamato Series (1974) (Mamoru Kodai)
Vicky the Viking (1974) (Snope)
La Seine no Hoshi (1975) (The Black Tulip, Narrator)
Captain Future (1978) (Captain Future)
Sherlock Hound (1984) (Holmes)
Miracle Girls (1993) (Narrator)
Soreike! Anpanman (1998) (Hamled)
Mezzo DSA (2004) (Kenichi Kurokawa)

OVA
Yamato 2520 (1995) (Narrator)

Theatrical animation
Saint Seiya: Legend of Crimson Youth (1988) (Abel)
Pokémon Heroes (2002) (Announcer)

Dub Work

Live-action
Tony Curtis
Some Like It Hot
The Great Race
Spartacus
Sweet Smell of Success (first time dubbing Curtis)
The Persuaders!
The Defiant Ones
Vega$
Robert Redford
Butch Cassidy and the Sundance Kid
The Great Gatsby
Spy Game (TV Tokyo version)
All the President's Men (TBS version)
A Bridge Too Far (NTV version)
Legal Eagles (TV Tokyo version)
Roger Moore
The Cannonball Run
Live and Let Die
The Man with the Golden Gun
The Spy Who Loved Me
Moonraker
For Your Eyes Only
Octopussy
A View to a Kill
Dan Aykroyd
Trading Places
Ghostbusters
Ghostbusters II
Dragnet
Michael Hui
The Private Eyes (Wong Yeuk Sze)
Rob-B-Hood (The Landlord)
Batman (Batman (Adam West))
Bean (Mr. Bean (Rowan Atkinson))
Dracula: Prince of Darkness (Charles Kent (Francis Matthews))
Face to Face (1977 TV Asahi edition) (Professor Brad Fletcher (Gian Maria Volonté))
Frankenstein Created Woman (1970 TV Asahi edition) (Hans Werner (Robert Morris))
Little Nicky (The Deacon (Quentin Tarantino))
Monty Python's Flying Circus and The Holy Grail (Eric Idle)
On Her Majesty's Secret Service (1979 TBS edition (James Bond (George Lazenby)))
The Plague of the Zombies (Dr. Peter Tompson (Brook Williams))
Seven Golden Men Strike Again (1975 TV Asahi edition) (Albert the Professor (Philippe Leroy))
Splash (Dr. Walter Kornbluth (Eugene Levy))
UFO (Commander Straker (Ed Bishop))
Wild Wild West (2002 NTV edition) (Dr. Arliss Loveless (Kenneth Branagh))
Young Frankenstein (Frederick Frankenstein (Gene Wilder))

Animation
The New Adventures of Superman (Superman)
Rocket Robin Hood (Rocket Robin Hood)
Wacky Races (Kizatoto-kun (Peter Perfect))

Tokusatsu
Juken Sentai Gekiranger (2007) (Voice of Confrontation Beast Pig-Fist Tabu)

Radio
Otoko-tachi no yoru kana
Edogawa Ranpo Series as Kogoro Akechi
Hoshi e Iku fune

References

External links
Taichirō Hirokawa at Internet Movie Database
 

Japanese male video game actors
Japanese male voice actors
Male voice actors from Tokyo
1939 births
2008 deaths
20th-century Japanese male actors
21st-century Japanese male actors